Gyrodoma is a genus of African flowering plants in the family Asteraceae.

Species
There is only one known species, Gyrodoma hispida, endemic to Mozambique.

References

Monotypic Asteraceae genera
Astereae
Endemic flora of Mozambique